Inhacorá is a municipality in the northern part of the state of Rio Grande do Sul, Brazil. The population is 2,215 (2020 est.) in an area of 114.11 km². Its elevation is 358 m. It is located 482 km west of the state capital of Porto Alegre, northeast of Alegrete.

Bounding municipalities
Alegria
São Valério do Sul
Chiapetta
Catuípe
Independência

References

External links
Municipal website

Municipalities in Rio Grande do Sul